Little Princess is a British  animated children's television series created by The Illuminated Film Company. Directed by Edward Foster seasons 1 - 3, Directed by Sue Tong season 4. It debuted in the United Kingdom in 2006. The programme is shown in the UK as part of Channel 5's Milkshake! and as Y Dywysoges Fach in the children's programming strand Cyw on the Welsh language channel S4C.

In English, the stories season 1 - 3 are narrated by Julian Clary, who also provides the voice of the cat Puss. Season 4 is narrated by Rufus Jones. Jane Horrocks provides the voice of the Little Princess. The series is based on the original books by Tony Ross and follows the success of Ross's 1986 book 'I Want My Potty', which was also turned into a five-minute short film. Subsaga pronounces it in French.

Characters
Narrator (voiced by Julian Clary and Rufus Jones)
Little Princess (voiced by Jane Horrocks)
Chef, Gardener, General and Prime Minister (voiced by Colin McFarlane)
The Queen (voiced by Maggie Ollerenshaw)
The King and Admiral (voiced by Edward Peel)
The Maid (voiced by Victoria Willing)
Great Uncle Walter (voiced by Brian Blessed)
Algie (voiced by Shelley Longworth)
Professor (voiced by Robert Webb)

Additional Voices
 Darren Boyd
 Keith Wickham
 David Holt
 Maria Darling
 Dustin Demri-Burns
 Terry Mynott
 Rob Rackstraw
 Vincenzo Nicoli
 Tom Stourton
 Lewis MacLeod
 Steven Kynman
 Tim Whitnall

Episodes

Series 1

Series 2

Series 3

Series 4

Specials

References

External links 
 http://www.littleprincesskingdom.com Little Princess website
 http://www.illuminatedfilms.com The Illuminated Film Company website
 Edward Foster's website

2006 British television series debuts
2000s British animated television series
2000s British children's television series
2010s British animated television series
2010s British children's television series
2020s British animated television series
2020s British children's television series
Animated television series about children
British children's animated comedy television series
British children's animated fantasy television series
British television shows based on children's books
British flash animated television series
Channel 5 (British TV channel) original programming
Television series about princesses
English-language television shows